The discography of Carl Cox, British house music and techno producer and DJ, consists of four albums, twenty-five singles, twenty-six compilation albums, and sixty-six remixes.

Studio albums
 1996: At The End Of The Cliche, Edel UK Records/Worldwide Ultimatum Records
 1999: Phuture 2000, Edel UK Records/Worldwide Ultimatum Records
 2005: Second Sign, Play It Again Sam
 2011: All Roads Lead To The Dancefloor, Intec Digital
 2022: Electronic Generations, BMG

Extended plays
 2019: Dark Alleys, Circus Recordings

Singles
 1989: Let's Do It, N/A
 1991: I Want You (Forever), Perfecto Records – UK No.23
 1992: Does It Feel Good To You, Perfecto Records
 1993: The Planet of Love, Perfecto Records – UK No.44
 1995: Two Paintings and A Drum, Edel UK Records – UK No.24
 1996: Sensual Sophis-ti-cat / The Player, Worldwide Ultimatum Records – UK No.25
 1996: Tribal Jedi, Edel UK Records/Worldwide Ultimatum Records
 1999: The Latin Theme, Edel UK Records – UK No.52
 1998: Phuture 2000, Worldwide Ultimatum Records – UK No.40
 1999: Dr. Funk, Edel UK Records/Worldwide Ultimatum Records
 2000: Golden Warrior, So Dens
 2003: Dirty Bass featuring Christian Smith, 23rd Century Records
 2003: Want A Life, Trust the DJ
 2004: Give Me All Your Love featuring Hannah Robinson, 23rd Century Records
 2004: Put Your Hands Up, Trust the DJ
 2006: Thats the Bass featuring Norman Cook, 23rd Century Records
 2006: K'Pasa, Intec Records
 2006: Spoon, Intec Records
 2011: Chemistry featuring Shelley Segal, Intec Digital
 2011: Nexus, Intec Digital
 2011: Family Guy, Intec Digital
 2012: Caipiroska, Snatch! Records
 2013: Time for House Music, Circus Recordings
 2014: See You Next Tuesday featuring Nicole Moudaber, MOOD Records
 2016: Your Light Shines On, Intec Digital
 2021: We Are One with Franky Wah, Ministry Of Sound
 2022: Speed Trials On Acid with Fatboy Slim featuring Dan Diamond, BMG

Compilations
 1994: Nonstopmix 1994, Liquid Rec.
 1994: Fantazia presents The DJ Collection Carl Cox, Fantazia
 1995: F.A.C.T., React
 1997: F.A.C.T. 2, Worldwide Ultimatum Records
 1998: DJF 250, Sony Music Entertainment
 1998: Non Stop 98/01, FFRR Records
 1998: The Sound Of Ultimate B.A.S.E., Worldwide Ultimatum Records
 1999: Non Stop 2000, FFRR Records
 1999: F.A.C.T. Australia, X-Over Recordings. Chart Peak (AUS) #88
 2000: Mixed Live Crobar Nightclub, Chicago, Moonshine Music
 2002: Mixed Live 2nd Session Area 2, Detroit, Moonshine Music
 2002: Club Traxx Vol. 1, Trust the DJ
 2003: Club Traxx Vol. 2, Trust the DJ
 2003: F.A.C.T. Australia II, Warner Music Group
 2003: U60311 Compilation Techno Division Vol. 3, V2 Records
 2004: Back To Mine, DMC Publishing
 2004: Pure Intec, Intec Records
 2007: Global, Play It Again Sam
 2008: Ultimate Carl Cox, Ministry of Sound Australia
 2010: Global Underground 38 – Black Rock Desert, Global Underground
 2013: Pure Intec 2: Mixed by Carl Cox, Intec Digital
 2014: Mixmag Presents Carl Cox: Sounds of Ibiza, Mixmag Records
 2014: Space Ibiza 2014: Carl Cox Mix, Cr2 Records
 2015: Mixmag Presents Carl Cox: Space Terrace Ibiza, Mixmag Records
 2015: In the Process of Eight, Circus Recordings
 2016: Space Ibiza 2016, Cr2 Records

Remixes
 1991: Supreme Love Gods – Cherry White (Carl Cox Remix), One Little Indian
 1991: art of Noise – Shades of Paranoimia (Carl Cox Remix), China Records
 1992: Eternal – Eternal (Carl Cox Remix), Underground Level Recordings
 1992: Robert Owens – Gotta Work (Carl's Renaissance Remix), Freetown Inc.
 1992: Patti Day – Hot Stuff (Carl Cox Remix), Starway Records
 1992: DJ Phantasy – Jepron (Carl Cox Remix), Liquid Wax Recordings
 1992: Sunscreem – Perfect Motion (Carl Cox Rhythm's A Drug Remix), Sony BMG Music Entertainment
 1993: Visa – Let Me See Ya Move (Carl Cox's Militant March Remix), MMR Productions
 1993: Smooth But Hazzardous – Made You Dance (Carl Cox Remix), Sound Entity Records
 1994: Laurent Garnier – Astral Dreams (Carl Cox's MMR Remix), F-Communications
 1994: Trevor Rockcliffe Presents Glow – Break the Law (Carl's Reconstructed Remix), MMR Productions
 1994: Quench – Hope (Carl Cox's MMR Remix), Infectious Records
 1994: FKW – Jingo (Carl Cox Remix), PWL
 1994: O.T.T. – Raw (Carl Cox Remix), Industrial Strength Records
 1994: Conquer – Self Destruction (Carl Cox's Kinetic Mix), MMR Productions
 1994: Aurora Borealis – Raz (Carl's MMR Remix), F-Communications
 1994: English Muffin – The Blood of An English Muffin (Carl Cox Remix), MMR Productions
 1994: Lunatic Asylum – The Meltdown (Carl Cox & John Selway's Circular Circuit Remix), MMR Productions
 1995: Jam & Spoon – Angel (Ladadi O-Heyo) (Carl Cox Remix), Epic Records
 1995: The Stone Roses – Begging You (Cox's Ultimatum Remix), Geffen Records
 1995: Yello – L'Hotel (Carl Cox's Hands on Yello Remix), Urban
 1995: Dr. Fernando – Stomace Substance (Carl Cox Remix), MMR Productions
 1995: Infrequent Oscillation – Burning Phibes (Carl Cox Remix), MMR Productions
 1995: Technohead – Get Stoned (Carl Cox Remix), Mokum Records
 1995: AWeX – It's Our Future (Carl Cox's Ultimate Remix), Plastic City UK
 1995: Slab – Rampant Prankster (Carl Cox's Jumper Remix), Hydrogen Dukebox
 1995: Steve Mason & Tony Crooks – Shallow Grave (Carl Cox's After Hours Remix), Rain Forest Records
 1995: Josh Abrahams – March Time (Carl Cox Remix), MMR Productions
 1996: System 7 – Hangar 84 (Cox's W.W. Ultimatum Remix), Butterfly Records
 1996: Electroliners – Loose Caboose (Carl Cox Remix), XL Recordings
 1996: Barefoot Boys – Need No Man (Cox's Harder Remix), Stealth Records
 1996: The Advent – Mad Dog (Carl Cox Remix), Internal
 1996: JX – There's Nothing I Won't Do (Carl Cox's Full House Remix), FFRR Records
 1996: Consolidated – This Is Fascism (Carl Cox's Burning Gold Remix), MC Projects
 1996: Vernon – Vernon's Wonderland (Carl Cox's Full Remix), Eye Q
 1996: Poltergeist – Vicious Circles (Carl Cox's MMR Remix), Manifesto
 1997: DJ SS – DJs Anthem (Carl Cox Remix), Formation Records
 1997: Tenth Chapter – Prologue (Carl Cox & Paul van Dyk Remix), Jackpot
 1998: Stone Circle – The Sounds Of Ultimate B.A.S.E. (Carl Cox's Original Mix), Worldwide Ultimatum Records
 1999: Needle Damage – That Zipper Track (Carl Cox Remix), Worldwide Ultimatum Records
 1999: Grooverider – Where's Jack the Ripper? (Carl Cox's Techno Radio Edit), Higher Ground Records
 2000: Tony Moran Featuring Cindy Mizelle – Shine On (Carl Cox's Sweat Dub), Contagious Records
 2001: Slam – Positive Education (Carl Cox's Intec Remix), VC Recordings
 2001: Trevor Rockcliffe & Blake Baxter – Visions of You (Carl Cox Remix), Intec Records
 2001: Ramirez – Volcan De Pasion (Carl Cox Remix), Terapia
 2002: Cormano – Mangamana vs. Revenge (Carl Cox's Turntable Remix), 4 Play Records, Inc.
 2003: Tomaz vs Filterheadz – Sunshine (Carl Cox Remix), Intec Records
 2003: Bad Cabbage – You're Rude (Get Fucked) (Carl Cox's Not So Rude Remix), Mutant Disc
 2004: Eric Powell – Don't Deny It (Carl Cox Remix), 23rd Century Records
 2004: Johan Cyber – Natural Funk (Carl Cox Remix), 23rd Century Records
 2004: Cohen vs Deluxe – Just Kick! (Carl Cox Remix), Intec Records
 2005: Len Faki – Just A Dance (Carl Cox Remix), Figure
 2007: Sander Van Doorn – Riff (Carl Cox's Global Remix), Ultra Records
 2010: Jon Rundell – Damager (Carl Cox Remix), Intec
 2010: Moby – Walk With Me (Carl Cox Remix), Little Idiot
 2010: Gilles Peterson pres. Havana Cultura feat. Ogguere – Arroz con Pollo (Carl Cox Remix), Brownswood Recordings
 2010: Joey Beltram – Slice 2010 (Carl Cox Rerub), Bush Records
 2011: Dome Patrol – The Cutting Edge (Carl Cox & Julika Remix), Bush Records
 2012: Tom Taylor & Gareth Whitehead – Tired of Being Wrong (Carl Cox Remix), Bullet:Dodge
 2012: The Scumfrog, Sting – If I Ever Lose My Faith (Carl Cox Remix), Armada Recordings
 2013: Davide Squillace & Guti – The Other Side of Hustler (Carl Cox Remix), This And That
 2015: Pan-Pot – Riot (Carl Cox Remix), Second State
 2016: Steve Mulder vs. D-Shake – Techno Trance 2016 (Carl Cox Remix), Orange Recordings
 2016: Popof – Lidl Girl ft. Arno Joey (Carl Cox Collective Remix), Hot Creations
 2016: Josh Abrahams – The Traveller (Carl Cox Remix), Bush Records
 2016: Josh Wink – I'm Talking to You (Carl Cox Remix), Intec Records
 2019: Purple Disco Machine - Body Funk (Carl Cox Remix), A Positiva / Virgin EMI Records
 2020: Russell Small - It Is What It Is (Bad Ass Disco) (Carl Cox DnB Remix), Jango Music
 2020: Hannah Wants and Kevin Knapp - Call Me (Carl Cox Remix), Toolroom Productions
 2020: Deadmau5 and The Neptunes - Pomegranate (Carl Cox Remix), Mau5Trap
 2020: Kenneth Bager - Farmacia (Homage To Frankfurt) (Carl Cox Remix), Armada Music
 2021: Geraldine Hunt - Can't Fake the Feeling (Carl Cox Rework), Unidisc Music
 2021: Sofi Tukker - Drinkee (Carl Cox Remix), Ultra Records

References

External links 
 Carl Cox discography
 Biography

Electronic music discographies
House music discographies
Discographies of British artists